Ohlsdorf Cemetery ( or (former) ) in the Ohlsdorf quarter of the city of Hamburg, Germany, is the biggest rural cemetery in the world and the fourth-largest cemetery in the world. Most of the people buried at the cemetery are civilians, but there is also a large number of victims of war from various nations. The cemetery notably includes the Old Hamburg Memorial Cemetery (Althamburgischer Gedächtnisfriedhof, formerly Ehrenfriedhof) with the graves of many notable Hamburg citizens.

History and description 

In 1877 the Ohlsdorf Cemetery was established as a non-denominational and multi-regional burial site outside of Hamburg.

There are 4 entrances for vehicles and  public transport is provided with 25 bus stops of two bus lines of the Hamburger Verkehrsverbund. The cemetery is not only used as a burial ground, but also as a recreational area and tourist attraction. With its impressive mausoleums, rhododendron bushes, its ponds and birds, sculptures and funerary museum, about two million people from all over the world visit the cemetery every year.

About 40% of all burials in Hamburg take place in Ohlsdorf Cemetery; in 2002 there were 1600 interments and 4300 urn burials. Two hundred thirty gardeners take care of graves and all facilities.

Hamburg Commonwealth War Graves Commission Cemetery 
One of four permanent Commonwealth cemeteries in Germany, the Hamburg Commonwealth War Graves Commission Cemetery is located near chapel 12 (Kapelle 12) of the Ohlsdorf Cemetery.

During World War I over 400 Allied prisoners-of-war who died in German captivity were buried here, as well as sailors whose bodies had been washed ashore on the Frisian Islands. In 1923 the remains of British Commonwealth servicemen from 120 burial grounds in north-western Germany were brought to Hamburg. Further deceased Commonwealth soldiers of World War II and of the post-war period were buried here too.

Memorials for the victims of Nazism 
An additional memorial site was erected in 1951 at the nearby Jewish cemetery, Ilandkoppel, the "Monument for the Murdered Hamburg Jews".

Memorial for the victims of Nazi persecution
The "Monument for the Victims of Nazi Persecution" lies across from the "new crematorium". Erected in 1949, it has a stele with a marble slab lying in front, engraved with the names of 25 concentration camps. The adjacent graveyard has 105 above-ground urns and 29 buried ones containing the ashes of victims and German concentration camp soil. This memorial evolved from what was established there during a week-long remembrance in November 1945.

Monument for the victims of the Hamburg firestorm

The remains of some 38,000 victims of Operation Gomorrha, the bombing campaign that took place from July 24 to August 3, 1943, lie in a cross-shaped, landscaped mass grave. In 1952, a monument by Gerhard Marcks called "Passage over the River Styx" was erected in the middle of the site.

Memorial grove for the Hamburg Resistance fighters
To the right of the main entrance on Bergstraße, is the memorial grove for the Resistance fighters from Hamburg, 1933–1945. Located here since September 8, 1946, this memorial is the burial site for 55 anti-fascists who were either executed by the Nazis or died in custody. A bronze sculpture, created in 1953 by Hamburg sculptor Richard Steffen (1903–1964), stands at the entrance to the grove. A stone wall borders the grove, on which are the words of the Czech Resistance fighter and journalist, Julius Fučík, executed in 1943, "Mankind, we loved you – be vigilant".

Cemetery museum
The museum is dedicated to raising public interest for the Ohlsdorf cemetery, and for promoting historical and contemporary funeral culture. The collection in the museum, on display since 1996, focuses mainly on the history of Hamburg's cemetery culture. Since the Ohlsdorfer cemetery was opened in 1877 as the first American-style park cemetery in Germany, it is of significant importance to the European cemetery culture. The museum has old maps and tools, as well as  urns and some of the cemetery's oldest tombstones.

Notable burial sites
Part of the cemetery are three plots of the Commonwealth War Graves Commission (CWGC), which were used as burial sites for British Commonwealth and Allied servicemen of both World Wars. There are more than 2473 identified casualties commemorated by the CWGC.

Notable burials
Notable people buried at Ohlsdorf include the following:

 Anny Ahlers (1907–1933), opera singer
 Hans Albers (1891–1960), actor
 Wilhelm Amsinck (1752–1831), mayor of Hamburg
 Albert Ballin (1857–1918), German shipping magnate
 Monica Bleibtreu (1944–2009), Austrian born actress
 Hermann Blohm (1848–1930), German shipbuilder
 Hertha Borchert (1895–1985), actress
 Wolfgang Borchert (1921–1947), author and playwright
 Hans von Bülow (1830–1894), conductor, pianist and composer
 C. W. Ceram (1915–1972), journalist and author
 Wilhelm Cuno (1876–1933), German chancellor
 Ida Ehre (1900–1989), actress
 Neville Elliott-Cooper (1889–1918), World War I recipient of the Victoria Cross
 Heinz Erhardt (1909–1979), actor and comedian
 Renate Ewert (1936–1966), actress
 Jan Fedder (1955–2019), actor 
 Willy Fritsch (1901–1973), silent-film era actor
 Helmut Griem (1932–2004), actor
 Gustaf Gründgens (1899–1963), actor
 Carl Hagenbeck (1844–1913), merchant of wild animals and inventor of the modern zoo
 Albert Hehn (1908–1983), actor
 Gustav Hertz (1887–1975), physicist and Nobel Prize winner
 Heinrich Hertz (1857–1894), physicist
 Michael Jary (1906–1988), composer
 Carlo Karges (1951–2002), songwriter and guitarist
 Wolfgang Kieling (1924–1985), actor
 Christian Graf von Krockow (1927–2002), writer and political scientist
 Richard Kuöhl (1880–1961), sculptor
 James Last (1929–2015), composer and big band leader
 Alfred Lichtwark (1852–1914), art historian, museum curator, and art educator
 Hanns Lothar (1929–1967), film actor
 Felix von Luckner (1881–1966), navy officer and author
 Lev Lunts 1901–1924), Russian born Jewish writer
 Willy Maertens (1893–1967), actor and stage director
 Harry Meyen (1924–1979), film actor
 Inge Meysel (1910–2004), actress
 Johann Georg Mönckeberg (1839–1908), mayor
 Emil Naucke (1855–1900), strong man, circus and burlesque performer
 Domenica Niehoff (1945–2009), prostitute and activist
 Richard Ohnsorg (1876–1947), stage director
 Kurt Raab (1941–1988), actor, screenwriter and playwright
 Norbert Rohringer (1927–2009), Austrian child actor
 Philipp Otto Runge (1777–1810), painter
 Helmut Schmidt (1918–2015), senator, minister, between 1974 and 1982 chancellor of West Germany, since 1983 publisher of Die Zeit
 Loki Schmidt (1919–2010), wife of former chancellor Helmut Schmidt
 Fritz Schumacher (1869–1947), architect
 Kurt Sieveking (1897–1986), mayor of Hamburg
 Henry Vahl (1897–1977), actor
 Werner Veigel (1928–1995), television journalist
 Ernst Voss (1842–1920), German shipbuilder
 James Allen Ward (1919–1941), New Zealand airman and Victoria Cross recipient
 Herbert Weichmann (1896–1983), first mayor of Hamburg
 Hilde Weissner (1909–1987), actress
 Lawrence Winters (1915–1965), opera singer
 Carolin Wosnitza (1987–2011), pornographic actress
 Helmut Zacharias (1920–2002), violinist

See also

 Ohlsdorf Jewish Cemetery, nearby

References

Further reading

External links

 Hamburger Friedhöfe 
 Significant cemeteries

Cemeteries in Hamburg
Commonwealth War Graves Commission cemeteries in Germany
Geography of Hamburg
World War I cemeteries in Germany
World War II memorials in Germany
World War II cemeteries in Germany
Museums in Hamburg
Tourist attractions in Hamburg
Burial sites of the House of Cirksena
Rural cemeteries